Sarchehan may refer to:
 Sarchehan District
 Sarchehan Rural District